Sungai Siput (U) (Jawi: سوڠاي سيڤوت; Tamil: சுங்கை சீப்புட்) (English: Snail River) is a town and mukim in Kuala Kangsar District, Perak, Malaysia, covering 155.141 hectares, 61.5% of the total area of Kuala Kangsar. Sungai Siput falls under the management of the Kuala Kangsar Municipal Council.

History 
The earliest settlement in Sungai Siput was situated at Pelang, about 2 kilometres from the current town. The settlement was populated by villagers of Minangkabau origins who had earlier settled in Sayong. The settlers were from the family of Malik and the son Tuyub, which family tomb is still visible from the roadside situated in the estate in front of the Rimba Panjang new village. One of the descendants was the late Imam Jusuh, one of the first imams of the Alghufraniah Sungai Siput Mosque and the town councillor. Sister Enson was a well-known traditional healer. One of the surviving siblings is Associate Professor Suhaimi Bin Saidin, a lecturer at Universiti Sultan Azlan Shah in Kuala Kangsar. With the arrival of British planters and tin miners in the early 1850s the focus of activity moved to the present Sungai Siput town.

Sungai Siput is notable for the incident that triggered the start of the Malayan Emergency. The Malayan colonial administration declared a state of emergency on 16 June 1948 after members of the Communist Party of Malaya killed three European plantation managers at a plantation office twenty miles east of Sungai Siput town. The CPM was subsequently banned in July. Many Singaporean historians and anti-communists allege that Chin Peng ordered the killings. Chin Peng claims he had no prior knowledge. In fact, he says he was so unprepared for the start of hostility that he barely escaped arrest, losing his passport in the process, and lost touch with the party for a couple of days.

Li Weilun, an Esperanto professor at the Beijing Language and Culture University, was born in Sungai Siput in 1936.

Demographics

In Brief 
Sungai Siput is governed by Pejabat Daerah Dan Tanah Sungai Siput. In 2010, Sungai Siput had an estimated population density of 49,000 inhabitants. The district's population in 2010 was Malay & other indigenous (Bumiputera) 15,745 (33.1%), Chinese 18,255 (38.4%), Indians 13,439 (28.3%) and Other group 113.

Sungai Siput was founded as a tin mining and rubber plantation district but has slowly shifted its economy and now is closely linked with agricultural and manufacturing based activities while still maintaining the position in plantation sector. 

Sungai Siput is famous for its groundnuts and can easily be bought in one of the shops along the main street. The name is synonym with Shandong and Menglembu groundnuts and the crunchiness of the roasted nuts make the most favourite snack around the region. Another famous snack of Sungai Siput is Sat Kei Ma, a sweet biscuit with ingredients consist of eggs, salt, sugar, baking powder and flour, shaped into flat strips that are fried until crispy and sticky.
Sungai Siput is a bustling town notable for variety of traditional cuisine and offers tourists and people in the neighbourhood with a vibrant food scene as witnessed by a growth of hawker centres and restaurants.

There's a food court beside TF Valuemart hypermarket with an array of four blocks of corner shop lots and with more than a dozen of food stall operators offering variety of local Chinese, Malay and Indian food. Western style delicacy is also available.

In the older part of Sungai Siput town, you will find Chinese traditional meals including different types of noodles, à la carte combination of dishes, Handmade Fish Noodles, Poached Duck, Handmade Fish Balls, Yong Tau Foo and Fried Porridge. A small row of stalls opposite the former Nanyang theater offer localised Chinese dishes and simple food at reasonable price.

Sungai Siput is equally a favourite hang-out point for the local crowd of multi-ethnicity hunting for Malay and Indian palatable dishes.

Politics 
The Sungai Siput parliamentary seat has consistently voted for Alliance and later Barisan Nasional candidates since independence. However, in the 2008 Malaysian general election was won Dr Jeyakumar Devaraj, a Parti Sosialis Malaysia member who contested under the People's Justice Party (PKR) ticket in the Pakatan Rakyat coalition. Dr Michael Jeyakumar Devaraj defeated the previous incumbent, Dato Seri Samy Vellu, who had held the seat since 1974. The seat was successfully defended by Kesavan Subramaniam (PKR) in the 2018 Malaysian general election. As of 2022, there were 72,452 voters in Sungai Siput. Most of the voters in Sungai Siput are Chinese, followed by Malays, Indians and others.

Education

Schools in Sungai Siput, Perak

This is a list of schools in Sungai Siput, Perak.
Methodist Primary School
Sekolah Menengah Kebangsaan Methodist
Sekolah Menengah Kebangsaan RLKT Lasah
Sekolah Menengah Jenis Kebangsaan (SMJK) Shing Chung
Sekolah Kebangsaan Sungai Siput
SJK(C) Sungai Buloh
SJKT TUN Sambanthan Ladang SG.Siput
SMK Tok Muda Abdul Aziz
SMK Bawong
SJK(T) HEAWOOD SUNGAI SIPUT
SK(T) Mahathma Gandhi Kalasalai
SJK(C) Hing Wa
SK Lintang
SK Maamor
SMK Datuk Haji Abdul Wahab
SUNGAI SIPUT THIRUMURAI CLASS

Mahatma Gandhi Kalasalai Tamil School is the biggest Tamil school in the state with over 1000 students. The school's construction was commissioned by Tun V. T. Sambanthan in 1954 and was officially opened by Vijaya Lakshmi Pandit, former Indian Prime Minister Jawaharlal Nehru's sister.

See also
 Tamil population by cities

References

Kuala Kangsar District
Towns in Perak
Mukims of Perak